Gowalkot is a small fort located on the southern bank of Vashishti River, about  from Chiplun in Maharashtra, India. This fort is guarded by the river on three sides and a trench on the fourth side. Its population which includes Hindus, Muslims, and Buddhists. According to old natives of Gowalkot, the history of Gowalkot goes back to a King, who was Hindu and finally was converted in Muslim, his surname was "Chougle", and most of the land in Gowalkot is owned by the Chougle family. All other owner of land in Gowalkot must have either received the land as gift [or bought] from Chougle family must have lost in "kul kaida" a rule by the government.

History
Famous for its ancient fort build by Siddi Habshi of Janjira in 1690. The Gowalkot Fort covers an area of around two acres. In 1660, Shivaji Maharaj won this fort and renamed as Govindgad. Sambhaji Maharaj lost this fort to Siddi. In 1736, Chimaji Appa won this fort by killing Siddi Sat in battle. In this battle Siddhi Sat lost 1300 soldiers and Maratha army lost 800 soldiers. Tulaji Angre/Sarkhel Tulaji, in 1745, captured it from. Later in 1755, Tulaji Angre lost it to the Peshwa and eventually in 1818 East India Company took control from the Peshwa. Portuguese ships attacked this fort during the Siege of Dabhol.

Description
The fort is dilapidated at present. This fort is spread over 2 acres of land. There is a temple of goddess Karanjeshwari at the foothills of the fort. From the top of the small hill on the fort, the most beautiful and stunning glimpse of the smoothly flowing Vashishti River and the undulating valley is visible. It takes about 1 hour to reach the fort and view all places in the fort. There were about 22 cannons around the fort. The 10 cannons were shifted from the port area to the fort on 29 May 2017 by archeologist from Pune and Chiplun. The longest cannon is 7.5 feet in length. These cannons are British made but, supposed to be used by Maratha army.

See also

 Anjanvel Fort
 Kalusta
 List of forts in India
 Kanhoji Angre
 Murud-Janjira
 List of forts in Maharashtra
 Marathi People
 Maratha Navy
 List of Maratha dynasties and states
 Battles involving the Maratha Empire
 Maratha Army
 Maratha titles
 Military history of India
 List of people involved in the Maratha Empire

References

Islands of Maharashtra
Forts in Maharashtra
River islands of India
Buildings and structures of the Maratha Empire
16th-century forts in India
Former populated places in India
Hiking trails in India
Islands of India
Uninhabited islands of India